Exaeretia concaviuscula is a moth in the family Depressariidae. It was described by S.X. Wang in 2005. It is found in China (Gansu).

References

Moths described in 2005
Exaeretia
Moths of Asia